Crimes

Polygamy (from Late Greek  "state of marriage to many spouses") is the practice of marrying multiple spouses. When a man is married to more than one wife at the same time, sociologists call this polygyny. When a woman is married to more than one husband at a time, it is called polyandry.

In contrast to polygamy, monogamy is marriage consisting of only two parties. Like "monogamy", the term "polygamy" is often used in a de facto sense, applied regardless of whether a state recognizes the relationship. In sociobiology and zoology, researchers use polygamy in a broad sense to mean any form of multiple mating.

Worldwide, different societies variously encourage, accept or outlaw polygamy. In societies which allow or tolerate polygamy, in the vast majority of cases the form accepted is polygyny. According to the Ethnographic Atlas Codebook (1998), of 1,231 societies noted, 588 had frequent polygyny, 453 had occasional polygyny, 186 were monogamous and 4 had polyandryalthough more recent research suggests that polyandry may occur more commonly than previously thought. In cultures which practice polygamy, its prevalence among that population often correlates with social class and socioeconomic status.

From a legal point of view, in many countries, although the law only recognises monogamous marriages (a person can only have one spouse, and bigamy is illegal), adultery is not illegal, leading to a situation of de facto polygamy being allowed, although without legal recognition for non-official "spouses".

Scientific studies classify the human mating system as primarily monogamous, with the cultural practice of polygamy in the minority, based both on surveys of world populations, and on characteristics of human reproductive physiology.

Polygamy (taking the form of polygyny) is most common in a region known as the "polygamy belt" in West Africa and Central Africa, with the countries estimated to have the highest polygamy prevalence in the world being Burkina Faso, Mali, Gambia, Niger and Nigeria.

Forms
Polygamy exists in three specific forms:
 Polygyny, where a man has multiple simultaneous wives
 Polyandry, where a woman has multiple simultaneous husbands
 Group marriage, where the family unit consists of multiple husbands and multiple wives of legal age

Polygyny

Incidence

Polygyny, the practice wherein a man has more than one wife at the same time, is by far the most common form of polygamy. Many Muslim-majority countries and some countries with sizable Muslim minorities accept polygyny to varying extents both legally and culturally. In several countries, such as India, the law only recognizes polygamous marriages for the Muslim population. Islamic law or sharia is a religious law forming part of the Islamic tradition which allows polygyny. It is derived from the religious precepts of Islam, particularly the Quran and the hadith. In Arabic, the term sharīʿah refers to God's (Arabic: الله Allāh) immutable divine law and is contrasted with fiqh, which refers to its human scholarly interpretations.

Polygyny is more widespread in Africa than on any other continent, especially in West Africa, and some scholars see the slave trade's impact on the male-to-female sex ratio as a key factor in the emergence and fortification of polygynous practices in regions of Africa. In the region of sub-Saharan Africa, polygyny is common and deeply rooted in the culture, with 11% of the population of sub-Saharan Africa living in such marriages (25% of the Muslim population and 3% of the Christian population, as of 2019). According to Pew, polygamy is widespread in a cluster of countries in West and Central Africa, including Burkina Faso, (36%), Mali (34%) and Nigeria (28%).

Anthropologist Jack Goody's comparative study of marriage around the world utilizing the Ethnographic Atlas demonstrated a historical correlation between the practice of extensive shifting horticulture and polygamy in the majority of sub-Saharan African societies. Drawing on the work of Ester Boserup, Goody notes that the sexual division of labour varies between the male-dominated intensive plough-agriculture common in Eurasia and the extensive shifting horticulture found in sub-Saharan Africa. In some of the sparsely-populated regions where shifting cultivation takes place in Africa, women do much of the work. This favours polygamous marriages in which men seek to monopolize the production of women "who are valued both as workers and as child bearers". Goody however, observes that the correlation is imperfect and varied, and also discusses more traditionally male-dominated though relatively extensive farming systems such as those traditionally common in much of West Africa, especially in the West African savanna, where more agricultural work is done by men, and where polygyny is desired by men more for the generation of male offspring whose labor is valued.

Anthropologists Douglas R. White and Michael L. Burton discuss and support Jack Goody's observation regarding African male farming systems in "Causes of Polygyny: Ecology, Economy, Kinship, and Warfare" where these authors note:

 
An analysis by James Fenske (2012) found that child mortality and ecologically related economic shocks had a significant association with rates of polygamy in subsaharan Africa, rather than female agricultural contributions (which are typically relatively small in the West African savanna and sahel, where polygyny rates are higher), finding that polygyny rates decrease significantly with child mortality rates.

Types of polygyny 
Polygynous marriages fall into two types: sororal polygyny, in which the co-wives are sisters, and non-sororal, where the co-wives are not related. Polygyny offers husbands the benefit of allowing them to have more children, may provide them with a larger number of productive workers (where workers are family), and allows them to establish politically useful ties with a greater number of kin groups. Senior wives can benefit as well when the addition of junior wives to the family lightens their workload. Wives', especially senior wives', status in a community can increase through the addition of other wives, who add to the family's prosperity or symbolize conspicuous consumption (much as a large house, domestic help, or expensive vacations operate in a western country). For such reasons, senior wives sometimes work hard or contribute from their own resources to enable their husbands to accumulate the bride price for an extra wife.

Polygyny may also result from the practice of levirate marriage. In such cases, the deceased man's heir may inherit his assets and wife; or, more usually, his brothers may marry the widow. This provides support for the widow and her children (usually also members of the brothers' kin group) and maintains the tie between the husbands' and wives' kin groups. The sororate resembles the levirate, in that a widower must marry the sister of his dead wife. The family of the late wife, in other words, must provide a replacement for her, thus maintaining the marriage alliance. Both levirate and sororate may result in a man having multiple wives.

In monogamous societies, wealthy and powerful men established enduring relationships with, and established separate household for, multiple female partners, aside from their legitimate wives; a practice accepted in Imperial China up until the Qing Dynasty of 1636–1912. This constitutes a form of de facto polygyny referred to as concubinage.

Household organization
Marriage is the moment at which a new household is formed, but different arrangements may occur depending upon the type of marriage and some polygamous marriages do not result in the formation of a single household. In many polygynous marriages the husband's wives may live in separate households. They can thus be described as a "series of linked nuclear families with a 'father' in common".

Polyandry

Incidence

Polyandry, the practice of a woman having more than one husband at the one time, is much less prevalent than polygyny. It is specifically provided in the legal codes of some countries, such as Gabon.

Polyandry is believed to be more common in societies with scarce environmental resources, as it is believed to limit human population growth and enhance child survival. It is a rare form of marriage that exists not only among poor families, but also the elite. For example, in the Himalayan Mountains polyandry is related to the scarcity of land; the marriage of all brothers in a family to the same wife allows family land to remain intact and undivided. If every brother married separately and had children, family land would be split into unsustainable small plots. In Europe, this outcome was avoided through the social practice of impartible inheritance, under which most siblings would be disinherited.

Types
Fraternal polyandry was traditionally practiced among nomadic Tibetans in Nepal, parts of China and part of northern India, in which two or more brothers would marry the same woman. It is most common in societies marked by high male mortality. It is associated with partible paternity, the cultural belief that a child can have more than one father.

Non-fraternal polyandry occurs when the wives' husbands are unrelated, as among the Nayar tribe of India, where girls undergo a ritual marriage before puberty, and the first husband is acknowledged as the father of all her children. However, the woman may never cohabit with that man, taking multiple lovers instead; these men must acknowledge the paternity of their children (and hence demonstrate that no caste prohibitions have been breached) by paying the midwife. The women remain in their maternal home, living with their brothers, and property is passed matrilineally. A similar form of matrilineal, de facto polyandry can be found in the institution of walking marriage among the Mosuo tribe of China.

Serial monogamy
Serial monogamy refers to remarriage after divorce or death of a spouse from a monogamous marriage, i.e. multiple marriages but only one legal spouse at a time (a series of monogamous relationships).

According to Danish scholar Miriam K. Zeitzen, anthropologists treat serial monogamy, in which divorce and remarriage occur, as a form of polygamy as it also can establish a series of households that may continue to be tied by shared paternity and shared income. As such, they are similar to the household formations created through divorce and serial monogamy.

Serial monogamy creates a new kind of relative, the "ex-". The "ex-wife", for example, can remain an active part of her "ex-husband's" life, as they may be tied together by legally or informally mandated economic support, which can last for years, including by alimony, child support, and joint custody. Bob Simpson, the British social anthropologist, notes that it creates an "extended family" by tying together a number of households, including mobile children. He says that Britons may have ex‑wives or ex‑brothers‑in‑law, but not an ex‑child. According to him, these "unclear families" do not fit the mold of the monogamous nuclear family.

Group marriage

Group marriage is a non-monogamous marriage-like arrangement where three or more adults live together, all considering themselves partners, sharing finances, children, and household responsibilities. Polyamory is on a continuum of family-bonds that includes group marriage. The term does not refer to bigamy as no claim to being married in formal legal terms is made.

Religious attitudes towards polygamy

Buddhism
Buddhism does not regard marriage as a sacrament; it is purely a secular affair.  Normally Buddhist monks do not participate in it (though in some sects priests and monks do marry). Hence marriage receives no religious sanction. Forms of marriage, in consequence, vary from country to country. The Parabhava Sutta states that "a man who is not satisfied with one woman and seeks out other women is on the path to decline". Other fragments in the Buddhist scripture seem to treat polygamy unfavorably, leading some authors to conclude that Buddhism generally does not approve of it or alternatively regards it as a tolerated, but subordinate, marital model.

Polygamy in Thailand was legally recognized until 1935. Polygamy in Myanmar was outlawed in 2015. In Sri Lanka, polyandry was legal in the kingdom of Kandy, but outlawed by British after conquering the kingdom in 1815. When the Buddhist texts were translated into Chinese, the concubines of others were added to the list of inappropriate partners. Polyandry in Tibet was traditionally common, as was polygyny, and having several wives or husbands was never regarded as having sex with inappropriate partners.
Most typically, fraternal polyandry is practiced, but sometimes father and son have a common wife, which is a unique family structure in the world. Other forms of marriage are also present, like group marriage and monogamous marriage. Polyandry (especially fraternal polyandry) is also common among Buddhists in Bhutan, Ladakh, and other parts of the Indian subcontinent.

Celtic traditions
Some pre-Christian Celtic pagans were known to practice polygamy, although the Celtic peoples wavered between it, monogamy and polyandry depending on the time period and the area. In some areas this continued even after Christianization began, for instance the Brehon Laws of Gaelic Ireland explicitly allowed for polygamy, especially amongst the noble class. Some modern Celtic pagan religions accept the practice of polygamy to varying degrees, though how widespread the practice is within these religions is unknown.

Christianity

Although the Old Testament describes numerous examples of polygamy among devotees to God, most Christian groups have rejected the practice of polygamy and have upheld monogamy alone as normative. Nevertheless, some Christians groups in different periods have practiced, or currently do practice, polygamy. Some Christians actively debate whether the New Testament or Christian ethics allows or forbids polygamy.

Although the New Testament is largely silent on the subject of polygamy, some point to Jesus's repetition of the earlier scriptures, noting that a man and a wife "shall become one flesh". However, some look to Paul's writings to the Corinthians: "Do you not know that he who is joined to a prostitute becomes one body with her? For, as it is written, 'The two will become one flesh. Supporters of polygamy claim that this verse indicates that the term refers to a physical, rather than a spiritual, union.

Some Christian theologians argue that in Matthew 19:3–9 and referring to Genesis 2:24, Jesus explicitly states a man should have only one wife:

1 Timothy 3:2 states:
 See verse 12 regarding deacons having only one wife. Similar counsel is repeated in the first chapter of the Epistle to Titus.

Periodically, Christian reform movements that have sought to rebuild Christian doctrine based on the Bible alone (sola scriptura) have temporarily accepted polygyny as a Biblical practice. For example, during the Protestant Reformation, in a document which was simply referred to as "Der Beichtrat" (or "The Confessional Advice" ), Martin Luther granted the Landgrave Philip of Hesse, who, for many years, had been living "constantly in a state of adultery and fornication", a dispensation to take a second wife. The double marriage was to be done in secret, however, to avoid public scandal. Some fifteen years earlier, in a letter to the Saxon Chancellor Gregor Brück, Luther stated that he could not "forbid a person to marry several wives, for it does not contradict Scripture." ("Ego sane fateor, me non posse prohibere, si quis plures velit uxores ducere, nec repugnat sacris literis.")

In Sub-Saharan Africa, tensions have frequently erupted between advocates of the Christian insistence on monogamy and advocates of the traditional practice of polygamy. For instance, Mswati III, the Christian king of Eswatini, has 15 wives. In some instances in recent times, there have been moves for accommodation; in other instances, churches have strongly resisted such moves. African Independent Churches have sometimes referred to those parts of the Old Testament that describe polygamy in defense of the practice.

The illegality of polygamy in certain areas creates, according to certain Bible passages, additional arguments against it. Paul the Apostle writes "submit to the authorities, not only because of possible punishment but also because of conscience" (Romans 13:5), for "the authorities that exist have been established by God." (Romans 13:1) St Peter concurs when he says to "submit yourselves for the Lord's sake to every authority instituted among men: whether to the king, as the supreme authority, or to governors, who are sent by him to punish those who do wrong and to commend those who do right." (1 Peter 2:13,14) Pro-polygamists argue that, as long as polygamists currently do not obtain legal marriage licenses nor seek "common law marriage status" for additional spouses, no enforced laws are being broken any more than when monogamous couples similarly co-habitate without a marriage license.

Roman Catholic Church
The Roman Catholic Church condemns polygamy; the Catechism of the Catholic Church lists it in paragraph 2387 under the head "Other offenses against the dignity of marriage" and states that it "is not in accord with the moral law." Also in paragraph 1645 under the head "The Goods and Requirements of Conjugal Love" states "The unity of marriage, distinctly recognized by our Lord, is made clear in the equal personal dignity which must be accorded to husband and wife in mutual and unreserved affection. Polygamy is contrary to conjugal love which is undivided and exclusive."

Saint Augustine saw a conflict with Old Testament polygamy. He refrained from judging the patriarchs, but did not deduce from their practice the ongoing acceptability of polygyny. On the contrary, he argued that the polygamy of the Fathers, which was tolerated by the Creator because of fertility, was a diversion from His original plan for human marriage. Augustine wrote: "That the good purpose of marriage, however, is better promoted by one husband with one wife, than by a husband with several wives, is shown plainly enough by the very first union of a married pair, which was made by the Divine Being Himself."

Augustine taught that the reason patriarchs had many wives was not because of fornication, but because they wanted more children. He supported his premise by showing that their marriages, in which husband was the head, were arranged according to the rules of good management: those who are in command (quae principantur) in their society were always singular, while subordinates (subiecta) were multiple. He gave two examples of such relationships: dominus-servus – master-servant (in older translation: slave) and God-soul. The Bible often equates worshiping multiple gods, i.e. idolatry to fornication. Augustine relates to that: "On this account there is no True God of souls, save One: but one soul by means of many false gods may commit fornication, but not be made fruitful."

As tribal populations grew, fertility was no longer a valid justification of polygamy: it "was lawful among the ancient fathers: whether it be lawful now also, I would not hastily pronounce (utrum et nunc fas sit, non temere dixerim). For there is not now necessity of begetting children, as there then was, when, even when wives bear children, it was allowed, in order to a more numerous posterity, to marry other wives in addition, which now is certainly not lawful."

Augustine saw marriage as a covenant between one man and one woman, which may not be broken. It was the Creator who established monogamy: "Therefore, the first natural bond of human society is man and wife." Such marriage was confirmed by the Saviour in the Gospel of Matthew (Mat 19:9) and by His presence at the wedding in Cana (John 2:2). In the Church—the City of God—marriage is a sacrament and may not and cannot be dissolved as long as the spouses live: "But a marriage once for all entered upon in the City of our God, where, even from the first union of the two, the man and the woman, marriage bears a certain sacramental character, can in no way be dissolved but by the death of one of them." In chapter 7, Augustine pointed out that the Roman Empire forbad polygamy, even if the reason of fertility would support it: "For it is in a man's power to put away a wife that is barren, and marry one of whom to have children. And yet it is not allowed; and now indeed in our times, and after the usage of Rome (nostris quidem iam temporibus ac more Romano), neither to marry in addition, so as to have more than one wife living." Further on he notices that the Church's attitude goes much further than the secular law regarding monogamy: It forbids remarrying, considering such to be a form of fornication: "And yet, save in the City of our God, in His Holy Mount, the case is not such with the wife. But, that the laws of the Gentiles are otherwise, who is there that knows not."

The Council of Trent condemns polygamy: "If anyone saith, that it is lawful for Christians to have several wives at the same time, and that this is not prohibited by any divine law; let him be anathema."

In modern times a minority of Roman Catholic theologians have argued that polygamy, though not ideal, can be a legitimate form of Christian marriage in certain regions, in particular Africa. The Roman Catholic Church teaches in its Catechism that: polygamy is not in accord with the moral law. [Conjugal] communion is radically contradicted by polygamy; this, in fact, directly negates the plan of God that was revealed from the beginning, because it is contrary to the equal personal dignity of men and women who in matrimony give themselves with a love that is total and therefore unique and exclusive.

Lutheran Church
The Lutheran World Federation hosted a regional conference in Africa, in which the acceptance of polygamists into full membership by the Lutheran Church in Liberia was defended as being permissible. The Lutheran Church in Liberia, however, does not permit polygamists who have become Christians to marry more wives after they have received the sacrament of Holy Baptism. Evangelical Lutheran missionaries in Maasai also tolerate the practice of polygamy and in Southern Sudan, some polygamists are becoming Lutheran Christians.

Anglican Communion
The 1988 Lambeth Conference of the Anglican Communion ruled that polygamy was permissible in certain circumstances:

Latter Day Saint movement

In accordance with what Joseph Smith indicated was a revelation, the practice of plural marriage, the marriage of one man to two or more women, was instituted among members of The Church of Jesus Christ of Latter-day Saints in the early 1840s. Despite Smith's revelation, the 1835 edition of the 101st Section of the Doctrine and Covenants, written after the doctrine of plural marriage began to be practiced, publicly condemned polygamy. This scripture was used by John Taylor in 1850 to quash Mormon polygamy rumors in Liverpool, England. Polygamy was made illegal in the state of Illinois during the 1839–44 Nauvoo era when several top Mormon leaders, including Smith, Brigham Young and Heber C. Kimball took multiple wives. Mormon elders who publicly taught that all men were commanded to enter plural marriage were subject to harsh discipline. On 7 June 1844 the Nauvoo Expositor criticized Smith for plural marriage.

The Church of Jesus Christ of Latter-day Saints (LDS Church)
After Joseph Smith was killed by a mob on 27 June 1844, the main body of Latter Day Saints left Nauvoo and followed Brigham Young to Utah where the practice of plural marriage continued. In 1852, Brigham Young, the second president of the LDS Church, publicly acknowledged the practice of plural marriage through a sermon he gave. Additional sermons by top Mormon leaders on the virtues of polygamy followed. Controversy followed when polygamy became a social cause, writers began to publish works condemning polygamy. The key plank of the Republican Party's 1856 platform was "to prohibit in the territories those twin relics of barbarism, polygamy and slavery". In 1862, Congress issued the Morrill Anti-Bigamy Act which clarified that the practice of polygamy was illegal in all US territories. The LDS Church believed that their religiously based practice of plural marriage was protected by the United States Constitution, however, the unanimous 1878 Supreme Court decision Reynolds v. United States declared that polygamy was not protected by the Constitution, based on the longstanding legal principle that "laws are made for the government of actions, and while they cannot interfere with mere religious belief and opinions, they may with practices."

Increasingly harsh anti-polygamy legislation in the US led some Mormons to emigrate to Canada and Mexico. In 1890, LDS Church president Wilford Woodruff issued a public declaration (the Manifesto) announcing that the LDS Church had discontinued new plural marriages. Anti-Mormon sentiment waned, as did opposition to statehood for Utah. The Smoot Hearings in 1904, which documented that the LDS Church was still practicing polygamy spurred the LDS Church to issue a Second Manifesto again claiming that it had ceased performing new plural marriages. By 1910 the LDS Church excommunicated those who entered into, or performed, new plural marriages. Even so, many plural husbands and wives continued to cohabit until their deaths in the 1940s and 1950s.

Enforcement of the 1890 Manifesto caused various splinter groups to leave the LDS Church in order to continue the practice of plural marriage. Polygamy among these groups persists today in Utah and neighboring states as well as in the spin-off colonies. Polygamist churches of Mormon origin are often referred to as "Mormon fundamentalist" churches even though they are not parts of the LDS Church. Such fundamentalists often use a purported 1886 revelation to John Taylor as the basis for their authority to continue the practice of plural marriage. The Salt Lake Tribune stated in 2005 that there were as many as 37,000 fundamentalists with less than half of them living in polygamous households.

On 13 December 2013, US Federal Judge Clark Waddoups ruled in Brown v. Buhman that the portions of Utah's anti-polygamy laws which prohibit multiple cohabitation were unconstitutional, but also allowed Utah to maintain its ban on multiple marriage licenses. Unlawful cohabitation, where prosecutors did not need to prove that a marriage ceremony had taken place (only that a couple had lived together), had been the primary tool used to prosecute polygamy in Utah since the 1882 Edmunds Act.

Mormon fundamentalism
The Council of Friends (also known as the Woolley Group and the Priesthood Council) was one of the original expressions of Mormon fundamentalism, having its origins in the teachings of Lorin C. Woolley, a dairy farmer excommunicated from the LDS Church in 1924. Several Mormon fundamentalist groups claim lineage through the Council of Friends, including but not limited to, the Fundamentalist Church of Jesus Christ of Latter Day Saints (FLDS Church), the Apostolic United Brethren, the Centennial Park group, the Latter Day Church of Christ, and the Righteous Branch of the Church of Jesus Christ of Latter-day Saints.

Community of Christ
The Community of Christ, known as the Reorganized Church of Jesus Christ of Latter Day Saints (RLDS Church) prior to 2001, has never sanctioned polygamy since its foundation in 1860. Joseph Smith III, the first Prophet-President of the RLDS Church following the reorganization of the Church, was an ardent opponent of the practice of plural marriage throughout his life. For most of his career, Smith denied that his father had been involved in the practice and insisted that it had originated with Brigham Young. Smith served many missions to the western United States, where he met with and interviewed associates and women claiming to be widows of his father, who attempted to present him with evidence to the contrary. Smith typically responded to such accusations by saying that he was "not positive nor sure that  was innocent", and that if, indeed, the elder Smith had been involved, it was still a false practice. However, many members of the Community of Christ and some of the groups that were previously associated with it are not convinced that Joseph Smith practiced plural marriage and they believe that the evidence which indicates that he practiced it is flawed.

Hinduism
The Rig Veda mentions that during the Vedic period, a man could have more than one wife. The practice is attested in epics like Ramayana and Mahabharata. The Dharmashastras permit a man to marry women provided that the first wife agree to marry him. Despite its existence, it was most usually practiced by men of higher status. Common people were only allowed a second marriage if the first wife could not bear a son or have some dispute because there is no law for divorce in Hinduism.

According to Vishnu Smriti, the number of wives is linked to the knowledge system:

This linkage of the number of permitted wives to the knowledge system is also supported by Baudhayana Dharmasutra and Paraskara Grihyasutra.

The Apastamba Dharmasutra and Manusmriti allow a second wife if the first one is unable to discharge her religious duties or is unable to bear a child or have any dispute because in Hinduism there was no law for divorce.

For a Brahmana, only one wife could rank as the chief consort who performed the religious rites (dharma-patni) along with the husband. The chief consort had to be of an equal knowledge. If a man married several women from the same knowledgeable, then eldest wife is the chief consort. Hindu kings commonly had more than one wife and are regularly attributed four wives by the scriptures. They were: Mahisi who was the chief consort, Parivrkti who had no son, Vaivata who is considered the favorite wife and the Palagali who was the daughter of the last of the court officials.

Traditional Hindu law allowed polygamy if the first wife could not bear a child.

The Hindu Marriage Act was enacted in 1955 by the Indian Parliament and made polygamy illegal for everyone in India except for Muslims. Prior to 1955, polygamy was permitted for Hindus. Marriage laws in India are dependent upon the religion of the parties in question.

Islam

In Islamic marital jurisprudence, under reasonable and warranted conditions, a Muslim man may have more than one wife at the same time, up to a total of four. Muslim women are not permitted to have more than one husband at the same time under any circumstances.

Based on verse 30:21 of Quran the ideal relationship is the comfort that a couple find in each other's embrace:

The polygyny that is allowed in the Quran is for special situations. There are strict requirements to marrying more than one woman, as the man must treat them fairly financially and in terms of support given to each wife, according to Islamic law. However, Islam advises monogamy for a man if he fears he cannot deal justly with his wives. This is based on verse 4:3 of Quran which says:

Muslim women are not allowed to marry more than one husband at once. However, in the case of a divorce or their husbands' death they can remarry after the completion of Iddah, as divorce is legal in Islamic law. A non-Muslim woman who flees from her non-Muslim husband and accepts Islam has the option to remarry without divorce from her previous husband, as her marriage with non-Muslim husband is Islamically dissolved on her fleeing. A non-Muslim woman captured during war by Muslims, can also remarry, as her marriage with her non-Muslim husband is Islamically dissolved at capture by Muslim soldiers. This permission is given to such women in verse 4:24 of Quran. The verse also emphasizes on transparency, mutual agreement and financial compensation as prerequisites for matrimonial relationship as opposed to prostitution; it says:

Muhammad was monogamously married to Khadija, his first wife, for 25 years, until she died. After her death, he married multiple women. Muhammad had a total of 9 wives at the same time, even though Muslim men were limited to 4 wives. His total wives are 11.

One reason cited for polygyny is that it allows a man to give financial protection to multiple women, who might otherwise not have any support (e.g. widows). However, some Islamic scholars say the wife can set a condition, in the marriage contract, that the husband cannot marry another woman during their marriage. In such a case, the husband cannot marry another woman as long as he is married to his wife. However, other Islamic scholars state that this condition is not allowed. According to traditional Islamic law, each of those wives keeps their property and assets separate; and are paid Mahr separately by their husband. Usually the wives have little to no contact with each other and lead separate, individual lives in their own houses, and sometimes in different cities, though they all share the same husband.

In most Muslim-majority countries, polygyny is legal with Kuwait being the only one where no restrictions are imposed on it. The practice is illegal in Muslim-majority Turkey, Tunisia, Albania, Kosovo, Azerbaijan, Bosnia and Herzegovina, Brunei, Sierra Leone,Guinea,
Kazakhstan, Turkmenistan, Kyrgyzstan , Uzbekistan, Tajikistan.

Countries that allow polygyny typically also require a man to obtain permission from his previous wives before marrying another, and require the man to prove that he can financially support multiple wives. In Malaysia and Morocco, a man must justify taking an additional wife at a court hearing before he is allowed to do so. In Sudan, the government encouraged polygyny in 2001 to increase the population.

Judaism

The Torah contains a few specific regulations that apply to polygamy, such as Exodus 21:10: "If he take another wife for himself; her food, her clothing, and her duty of marriage, shall he not diminish". Deuteronomy 21:15–17, states that a man must award the inheritance due to a first-born son to the son who was actually born first, even if he hates that son's mother and likes another wife more; and Deuteronomy 17:17 states that the king shall not have too many wives. Despite its prevalence in the Hebrew Bible, some scholars do not believe that polygyny was commonly practiced in the biblical era because it required a significant amount of wealth. Michael Coogan (and others), in contrast, states that "Polygyny continued to be practiced well into the biblical period, and it is attested among Jews as late as the second century CE".

The Dead Sea Scrolls show that several smaller Jewish sects forbade polygamy before and during the time of Jesus.
The Temple Scroll (11QT LVII 17–18) seems to prohibit polygamy. The rabbinical era that began with the destruction of the second temple in Jerusalem in 70 CE saw a continuation of some degree of legal acceptance for polygamy. In the Babylonian Talmud (BT), Kiddushin 7a, its states, "Raba said:  'Be thou betrothed to half of me,' she is betrothed: 'half of thee be betrothed to me,' she is not betrothed." The BT during a discussion of Levirate marriage in Yevamot 65a appears to repeat the precedent found in Exodus 21:10: "Raba said: a man may marry wives in addition to the first wife; provided only that he possesses the means to maintain them". The Jewish Codices began a process of restricting polygamy in Judaism.

Most notable in the rabbinic period on the issue of polygamy, though more specifically for Ashkenazi Jews, was the synod of Rabbeinu Gershom. About 1000 CE he called a synod which decided the following particulars: (1) prohibition of polygamy; (2) necessity of obtaining the consent of both parties to a divorce; (3) modification of the rules concerning those who became apostates under compulsion; (4) prohibition against opening correspondence addressed to another. Some Sephardic Jews such as Abraham David Taroç, were known to have several wives.

Polygamy was common among Jewish communities in the Levant, possibly due to the influence of Muslim society, with 17% of divorce claims by women being due to complaints over husbands taking additional wives.  According to R. Joseph Karo (16th century author of the last great codification of Jewish law, the Shulchan Aruch), and many other rabbis from Safed, the ban of Rabbeinu Gershom had expired, and therefore even Ashkenazim could marry additional wives. Even in instances where the husband made prenuptial agreements not to marry additional wives, local rabbis found loopholes to allow them to do so anyway.

The assembly led by Rabbeinu Gershom instituted a ban on polygamy, but this ban was not well received by the Sephardic communities. In addition to the ban, Gershon also introduced a law called Heter meah rabbanim which allows the men to remarry with the permission from one hundred rabbis from different countries.

In the modern day, polygamy is generally not condoned by Jews. Ashkenazi Jews have continued to follow Rabbenu Gershom's ban since the 11th century. Some Mizrahi Jewish communities (particularly Yemenite Jews and Persian Jews) discontinued polygyny more recently, after they immigrated to countries where it was forbidden or illegal. Israel prohibits polygamy by law.In practice, however, the law is loosely enforced, primarily to avoid interference with Bedouin culture, where polygyny is practiced. Pre-existing polygynous unions among Jews from Arab countries (or other countries where the practice was not prohibited by their tradition and was not illegal) are not subject to this Israeli law. But Mizrahi Jews are not permitted to enter into new polygamous marriages in Israel. However polygamy may still occur in non-European Jewish communities that exist in countries where it is not forbidden, such as Jewish communities in Iran and Morocco.

Former chief rabbi Ovadia Yosef has come out in favor of legalizing polygamy and the practice of pilegesh (concubine) by the Israeli government. Tzvi Zohar, a professor from the Bar-Ilan University, recently suggested that based on the opinions of leading halachic authorities, the concept of concubines may serve as a practical halachic justification for premarital or non-marital cohabitation.

Zoroastrianism

There is limited information about polygamy in Zoroastrian tradition. There is no passage in the Avesta that favors polygamy or monogamy. However, tradition holds that Zoroaster had three wives. Polygamy appears to have been a right of spiritual dignitaries and aristocrats. It is mentioned in foreign writings, such as the letter of Tansar.

It was also written about in the 4th century CE by the Roman soldier and historian Ammianus Marcellinus, writing about Zoroastrian communities.

Legal status

International law
In 2000, the United Nations Human Rights Committee reported that polygamy violates the International Covenant on Civil and Political Rights (ICCPR), citing concerns that the lack of "equality of treatment with regard to the right to marry" meant that polygamy, restricted to polygyny in practice, violates the dignity of women and should be outlawed. Specifically, reports to UN Committees have noted violations of ICCPR due to these inequalities, and reports to the UN General Assembly have recommended it be outlawed.

ICCPR does not apply to countries that have not signed it, which includes many Muslim countries such as Saudi Arabia, United Arab Emirates, Qatar, Malaysia, Brunei, Oman, and South Sudan.

Canada
Canada has taken a strong stand against polygamy, and the Canadian Department of Justice has argued that polygyny is a violation of International Human Rights Law, as a form of gender discrimination. In Canada, the federal Criminal Code applies throughout the country. It extends the definition of polygamy to having any kind of conjugal union with more than one person at the same time. Also anyone who assists, celebrates, or is a part to a rite, ceremony, or contract that sanctions a polygamist relationship is guilty of polygamy. Polygamy is an offence punishable by up to five years in prison. In 2017, two Canadian religious leaders were found guilty of practicing polygamy by the Supreme Court of British Columbia. Both of them are former bishops of the Mormon denomination of the Fundamentalist Church of Jesus Christ of Latter-Day Saints (FLDS).

Russia

United Kingdom
Bigamy is illegal in the United Kingdom. De facto polygamy (having multiple partners at the same time) is not a criminal offence, provided the person does not register more than one marriage at the same time. In the UK, adultery is not a criminal offence (it is only a ground for divorce). In a written answer to the House of Commons, "In Great Britain, polygamy is only recognized as valid in law in circumstances where the marriage ceremony has been performed in a country whose laws permit polygamy and the parties to the marriage were domiciled there at the time. In addition, immigration rules have generally prevented the formation of polygamous households in this country since 1988."

The 2010 UK government decided that Universal Credit (UC), which replaces means-tested benefits and tax credits for working-age people and will not be completely introduced until 2021, will not recognize polygamous marriages. A House of Commons briefing paper states "Treating second and subsequent partners in polygamous relationships as separate claimants could in some situations mean that polygamous households receive more under Universal Credit than they do under the current rules for means-tested benefits and tax credits. This is because, as explained above, the amounts which may be paid in respect of additional spouses are lower than those which generally apply to single claimants." There is currently no official statistics data on cohabiting polygamous couples who have arranged marriage in religious ceremonies.

United States

Polygamy is illegal in all 50 states in the U.S.

Polygamy in Utah remains a controversial issue that has been subject to legislative battles throughout the years. Utah is the only state where it is an infraction rather than a crime as of 2020; nevertheless recognizing polygamous unions is illegal under the Constitution of Utah. Federal legislation to outlaw the practice was endorsed as constitutional in 1878 by the Supreme Court in Reynolds v. United States, despite the religious objections of the Church of Jesus Christ of Latter-day Saints (Mormons).  This Church subsequently ended the practice of polygamy around the turn of the twentieth century; however, several smaller fundamentalist Mormon groups across the state (not associated with the mainstream Church) continue the practice.

On 13 December 2013, a federal judge, spurred by the American Civil Liberties Union and other groups, struck down the parts of Utah's bigamy law that criminalized cohabitation, while also acknowledging that the state may still enforce bans on having multiple marriage licenses. This decision was overturned by the United States Court of Appeals for the Tenth Circuit, thus effectively recriminalizing polygamy as a felony. In 2020, Utah voted to downgrade polygamy from a felony to an infraction, but it remains a felony if force, threats or other abuses are involved.

Prosecutors in Utah have long had a policy of not pursuing polygamy in the absence of other associated crimes (e.g. fraud, abuse, marriage of underage persons, etc.). There are about 30,000 people living in polygamous communities in Utah.

Individualist feminism and advocates such as Wendy McElroy and journalist Jillian Keenan support the freedom for adults to voluntarily enter polygamous marriages.

Authors such as Alyssa Rower and Samantha Slark argue that there is a case for legalizing polygamy on the basis of regulation and monitoring of the practice, legally protecting the polygamous partners and allowing them to join mainstream society instead of forcing them to hide from it when any public situation arises.

In an October 2004 op-ed for USA Today, George Washington University law professor Jonathan Turley argued that, as a simple matter of equal treatment under the law, polygamy ought to be legal. Acknowledging that underage girls are sometimes coerced into polygamous marriages, Turley replied that "banning polygamy is no more a solution to child abuse than banning marriage would be a solution to spousal abuse".

Stanley Kurtz, a conservative fellow at the Hudson Institute, rejects the decriminalization and legalization of polygamy. He stated:

In January 2015, Pastor Neil Patrick Carrick of Detroit, Michigan, brought a case (Carrick v. Snyder) against the State of Michigan that the state's ban of polygamy violates the Free Exercise and Equal Protection Clause of the U.S. Constitution. The case was dismissed with prejudice on 10 February 2016, for lack of standing.

Indonesia 
Indonesia is the most populous Muslim country. Most of the polygamy families come from Muslim family, also come from aristocrats, registered civil servants, Islamic students (santri), and wholesalers.

Constitutionally, Indonesia (basically) only recognize monogamy. But, government allows polygamy in some conditions:
 The wife cannot carry out her obligations as a wife.
 The wife has a physical disability or an incurable disease.
 The wife cannot bear children.

There are other requirements for registered civil servants.

Post-war Germany plans

In Nazi Germany, there was an effort by Martin Bormann and Heinrich Himmler to introduce new legislation concerning plural marriage. The argument ran that after the war, 3 to 4 million women would have to remain unmarried due to the great number of soldiers fallen in battle. In order to make it possible for these women to have children, a procedure for application and selection for suitable men (i.e. decorated war heroes) to enter a marital relationship with an additional woman was planned. The privileged position of the first wife was to be secured by awarding her the title Domina.

See also

 Polygyny
 Polyandry
 Bigamy
 Polyamory
 Conflict of marriage laws
 Legal status of polygamy
 List of polygamy court cases
 More danico
 Ménage à trois
 Polyday
 Serial monogamy
 Types of marriages
 List of people with the most children

Notes

References

Bibliography

External links

 History of Polygamy in Judaism
 "LIFE with Polygamists", 1944—slideshow by Life 
 5 Things I Learned as a Mormon Polygamous Wife

 
Mating systems
Religion and politics